Portland TV was a British adult television company that was owned by Neon X that offered subscription and pay-per-view services to UK audiences on the Sky UK, Virgin TV and Freeview platforms.

History
The company was established in London Docklands in 1995 as the adult broadcasting division of the British publishing group Northern & Shell. At one point, Portland owned its own broadcasting facilities, but they were transferred to Channel 5, which Northern & Shell also then owned.

In 2016, Portland TV was sold by Northern & Shell in a management buy-out, becoming wholly owned by Neon X, in a deal that saw Northern & Shell's complete departure from involvement in the UK television industry. Portland was reportedly sold for less than £1 million after contributing less than two per cent of group revenues per year over the previous three years, or about £9 million per annum. Portland's managing director, Chris Ratcliff, led the buyout. At the time, Portland was broadcasting five adult channels and two on-demand online services.

In September 2020, MG Global Entertainment (Europe) Limited, who owned fellow adult pay-per-view networks in the United Kingdom, purchased Portland TV and merged them into their own operations.

Channels
Television X was launched in 1995. Additional channels were launched as sub-brands of Television X, and the channel began Internet streaming content in 2007. Red Hot TV was launched in 2000 as an additional set of adult channels; the brand was renamed Xrated in 2017.

Current
 Television X (Launched in 1995 as "The Fantasy Channel")
 40+ (Launched in 2017)

Former
 Erotika
 Erotika 1 (closed on 1 March 2004)
 Erotika 2 (closed on 2 February 2004)
 Erotika 3 (closed on 2 February 2004)
 Erotika 4 (closed on 16 October 2003)
 Erotika 5 (closed on 16 October 2003)
 Erotika 6 (closed on 16 October 2003)
 Television X sister channels
 Television X Amateur
 Television X Brits
 Television X FFWD

Regulatory issues
In both 2008 and 2009, Portland was fined by Ofcom for broadcasting material equivalent to BBFC classification R18 on their Television X channels. The fines were £52,500 in total. In the same years, Portland was found to have breached the broadcasting code by advertising R18 website content on Red Hot TV, and on the second such occasion Portland was fined £25,000 by Ofcom.

References

Television channels and stations established in 1995
British pornographic television channels
Privately held companies of the United Kingdom